Kaajjal - Sabbki Aankhon Mein Basi, commonly known as Kaajjal is an Indian daily television serial that aired on Sony TV. This show replaced the previous show Kaisa Ye Pyar Hai.It centers around a young woman named Kaajjal, who hails from the small town of Mussourie, looking for the love of her life and finds instead Dev.

Plot 
Kaajjal (Surveen Chawla), a young, good-natured woman, comes from her small town to make it big and find the love of her life. She is an RJ with a popular morning show. However, instead of Prince Charming, she finds Dev (Apurva Agnihotri), an angry, arrogant man, who is the scion of an industrialist family. He is bitter towards life as his first love has died. He generally, keeps everyone at distance, including his friends and family. They vow never to meet again, but they do.

When Kaajjal reaches Mumbai after winning an RJ hunt, she works in Dev's office. In a drunken state, Dev confesses his love to Kaajjal, when he actually meant his ex-wife, Payal. Kaajjal is misunderstood and she falls in love with Dev. Dev avoids her at every cost. His friend, Dhruv, who just came back from the U.S., sees Kaajjal and falls in love with her at first sight. Dev and Kaajjal become friends; the more their friendship grew, the feelings Dev had for Kaajjal grew, too. Later, Dev wants to propose to Kaajjal. At the last moment he finds out about Dhruv liking her. He is heartbroken and stays away from Kaajjal. Not only that, he finds out he has a "shani" in his horoscope which could cause his death. And if he marries Kaajjal, the "shani" from his horoscope could fall on Kaajjal which would cause her death.

Kaajjal is still in love with Dev and tries to get close to him. Dev decides to get Kaajjal and Dhruv married and, with his evil sister-in-law, Amisha, who wants Dev to die, brings a marriage proposal on behalf of Dhruv. Dev doesn't tell who is the proposal from, and Kaajjal and her family thinking its from Dev agree. Dev invites Kaajjal to his hotel room one night, and he tries to misbehave with her. She is shocked to see lust in his eyes and slaps him. She runs away from there and Dev is happy to know that now she hates him, and at least now she will marry Dhruv.

Now Dev and Kaajjal are married to each other. Karan is bent on getting his revenge... 6 September is the last day for DK... After that a new reincarnation track will start as Dev and Kaajjal take a new birth and find each other, fall in love after knowing about their past life, and taking revenge against Karan. After going through all the trial and tribulations, Dev and Kaajjal finally gets married! All the villains — Karan, Kamyani, and Ranbir — die in a shootout, and the story ends!

Cast 
 Surveen Chawla as Kaajjal Behl / Kaajjal Dev Pratap Singh
 Apurva Agnihotri as Dev Pratap Singh 
 Vineeta Thakur / Tuhina Vohra as Nandini Karan Pratap Singh
 Rohit Bakshi as Karan Pratap Singh
 Kinshuk Mahajan as Devendra (Dev) 
 Deepak Bajaj as Veer Pratap Singh
 Kishwer Merchant as Amisha Veer Pratap Singh
 Sachin Tyagi as Aditya Garewal
 Shaleen Bhanot as Shivansh Kapoor 
 Rita Bhaduri as Bimmo Bua (Kaajjal's Aunt)
 Rocky Verma as Kidnapper
 Chahatt Khanna as Katie / Kaajjal 
 Praneet Bhat as Bunty
 Rati Agnihotri as Nayantara Pratap Singh
 Paritosh Sand as Satyaprakash Behl (Kaajjal's Father)
 Chetan Hansraj as Dhruv (Dev Pratap Singh's Best Friend)
 Rakshanda Khan as Kamayani
 Yash Sinha as Ranveer (Kamayani's Brother)
 Neelu Kohli as Devender's Aunt 
 Rituraj Singh as Katie / Kaajjal's Father
 Adita Wahi as Sonia
 Shama Sikander as Chameli
 Simple Kaul

Production 
The production house was Twenty Twenty and later on Shreya Creations took over.

External links 
 Official Site

2006 Indian television series debuts
2007 Indian television series endings
Indian television soap operas
Sony Entertainment Television original programming
Television shows set in Uttarakhand